Frances Lütken (born 2 October 1950) is a British cross-country skier. She competed in two events at the 1972 Winter Olympics.

References

External links
 

1950 births
Living people
British female cross-country skiers
Olympic cross-country skiers of Great Britain
Cross-country skiers at the 1972 Winter Olympics
People from Stratford-upon-Avon